Prunus arborea is a species of plant in the family Rosaceae. It is found in Indonesia, Malaysia, Singapore, and Thailand.

Varieties 
Six varieties are recognized:
Prunus arborea var. alticola Kalkman – Borneo, Sulawesi, and Sumatra
Prunus arborea var. arborea – Malesia and New Guinea
Prunus arborea var. densa (King) Kalkman – Peninsular Malaysia and New Guinea
Prunus arborea var. montana (Hook.f.) Kalkman – Eastern Himalayas and Indochina to southern China
Prunus arborea var. robusta (Koord. & Valeton) Kalkman – Java and Lesser Sunda Islands
Prunus arborea var. stipulacea (King) Kalkman – Borneo, Peninsular Malaysia, Sumatra, and Vietnam

References

arborea
Least concern plants
Taxonomy articles created by Polbot
Flora of Malesia
Flora of Indo-China
Flora of New Guinea
Flora of East Himalaya
Flora of South-Central China
Flora of Southeast China